Melfi is a town in the Guéra Region of southern-central Chad.

The Tele-Nugar Iron Mines, a UNESCO World Heritage Site, are located approximately 155 km south of Melfi.

Demographics 
Ethnic composition by canton in 2016:

Gogmi Canton (population: 15,917; villages: 63):

Melfi Canton (population: 23,700; villages: 104):

Transport
The town is served by Melfi Airport.

References

Guéra Region
Populated places in Chad